Shifen railway station is a railway station located in Pingxi District, New Taipei, Taiwan. It is located on the Pingxi line and is operated by the Taiwan Railways Administration.

Around the station
 Taiwan Coal Mine Museum

References

1929 establishments in Taiwan
Railway stations opened in 1929
Railway stations in New Taipei
Railway stations served by Taiwan Railways Administration